Raiders IHC 2 are an ice hockey team from Romford, England that compete in the NIHL South 1 Division. They are a minor league affiliate of Raiders IHC, who play in the NIHL National Division.

Season-by-season record

Club roster 2022-23
(*) Denotes a Non-British Trained player (Import)

2021/22 Outgoing

References

External links 

 Raiders 2 Roster

Ice hockey teams in England
Romford
Sport in the London Borough of Havering